KSTQ (93.5 FM) is a radio station licensed to Stuart, Oklahoma, United States. The station is currently owned by K95.5 Inc

History
This station was assigned call sign KSTQ on March 22, 2013.

References

External links
http://www.blakefm1025.com/

STQ
Country radio stations in the United States
Radio stations established in 2013